Maurice Janet (1888–1983) was a French mathematician.

Education and career
In 1912 as a student he visited the University of Göttingen. He was a professor at the University of Caen. He was an Invited Speaker of the International Congress of Mathematicians in 1924 in Toronto, in 1932 in Zürich, and in 1936 in Oslo.

Named in his honor are Janet bases, Janet sequences and a related algorithm in the theory of systems of partial differential equations. In 1926 he proved results that were later generalized by John Forbes Nash Jr. in his embedding theorem.

In 1948 Janet was the president of the Société Mathématique de France.  He was a close friend of the mathematician Ernest Vessiot.

Selected publications

Articles
Les systèmes d'équations aux dérivées partielles, Journal de mathématiques pures et appliquées  8 ser., t. 3 (1920), pages 65–123. (paper in which what is now called the Janet basis was introduced)

Books

References

External links
BNF

20th-century French mathematicians
1888 births
1983 deaths
Academic staff of the University of Caen Normandy
PDE theorists